Baillieston railway station is located in Caledonia Road on the southern boundary of the Baillieston area of Glasgow, Scotland, with the Broomhouse area on the other side of the tracks. Train services are provided by ScotRail.

The line was built in the period 1864-1866 by the Caledonian Railway and was called the Rutherglen to Coatbridge branch. 
The new station opened by British Rail on 4 October 1993 under the financial management of the Strathclyde PTE.

History

The original station, which was situated 1 km east of the present, was opened by the Caledonian Railway in January 1866 when passenger traffic started. The line became part of the London, Midland and Scottish Railway during the Grouping of 1923. The line then passed on to the Scottish Region of British Railways on nationalisation in 1948. The old station closed to passenger traffic in 1964.

Services

A half-hourly service operates between Glasgow Central (Low Level) and  stations, on Mondays to Saturdays.

Several freight trains also pass the halt every day.

References

 
 
 
 Station on navigable O.S. map

External links

Railway stations in Glasgow
SPT railway stations
Railway stations served by ScotRail
Railway stations in Great Britain opened in 1866
Railway stations in Great Britain closed in 1964
Railway stations in Great Britain opened in 1993
Beeching closures in Scotland
Former Caledonian Railway stations
1866 establishments in Scotland
Baillieston